Maria Anna Katharina Rutowska (1706–1746) was a Polish noblewoman.

She was the illegitimate daughter of Polish king Augustus II the Strong and his mistress, the Turk Fatima or Fatime, later renamed Maria Anna von Spiegel.

Life
Katharina was the second child of the liaison between Augustus II and Fatima; her older brother, Frederick Augustus, was born four years before.

Shortly after the birth of Frederick Augustus, the King married Maria Anna with his chamberman Johann Georg (von) Spiegel, but she remained as his mistress. Katharina was born during this marriage and legally used the name Maria Anna Katharina von Spiegel during her first years of life.

In 1715 her stepfather Johann Georg of Spiegel died; her mother Fatima survived him by only five years.

Augustus II took the guardianship of his children, but only recognized and legitimized both in 1724 and were granted the title of Count and Countess Rutowska.

The now Countess Rutowska was married off by her father on 1 October 1724. with the Polish nobleman Count Michał Bieliński. The marriage was an immediate failure and after eight unhappy years, in early 1732, they divorced.

In 1737 she re-married, this time, a Sabaudian aristocrat in Saxon service, Count Claude Marie de Bellegarde et d'Entremont (1700-1755). From this marriage she has two children: one son, Mauritz de Bellegarde (1743-1792), general-lieutenant in service of Saxe, and one daughter, Frédérique Augusta Marie de Bellegarde, named after her maternal grandparents, who married François Sébastien de Chevron-Villette, called the Comte de Villette, on 27 April 1779.  The marriage was childless.

References

Maria Anna Katharina
Illegitimate children of Augustus the Strong
18th-century Polish women
1706 births
1752 deaths
Polish people of Turkish descent
Daughters of kings